Antal van der Duim and Boy Westerhof retained their title, beating Rubén Ramírez Hidalgo and Matteo Viola 6–1, 6–3

Seeds

Draw

Draw

References
 Main Draw

2014 ATP Challenger Tour
2014 Doubles
2014 in Dutch tennis